The Lodge–Fish Resolution was a joint resolution of both houses of the US Congress that endorsed the British Mandate for Palestine. It was introduced in June 1922 by Hamilton Fish III, a Republican New York Representative, and Henry Cabot Lodge, a Republican Senator from Massachusetts.

It came about following a significant lobbying effort by the American Zionist community, particularly through the efforts of Zionist Rabbi Simon Glazer. It was opposed by the State Department; a prominent anti-Zionist rabbi at the congressional hearings; and the New York Times, which was owned by the anti-Zionist Adolph Ochs.

On September 21, 1922, US President Warren G. Harding signed the joint resolution of approval to establish a Jewish National Home in Palestine, per the 1917 Balfour Declaration.

Text
The full text is as follows:

"Favoring the establishment in Palestine of a national home for the Jewish people
Resolved by the Senate and House of Representatives of the United States of America in Congress assembled. That the United States of America favors the establishment in Palestine of a national home for the Jewish people, it being clearly understood that nothing shall be done which should prejudice the civil and religious rights of Christian and all other non-Jewish communities in Palestine, and that the holy places and religious buildings and sites in Palestine shall be adequately protected." [italics in the original]

Bibliography

References 

1922 in American law
United States federal legislation
United States foreign policy
1922 in international relations
United States foreign relations legislation
Israel–United States relations